Highway 683 is a highway in the Canadian province of Saskatchewan. It runs from Highway 312 to Highway 212 near Titanic.

See also 
Roads in Saskatchewan
Transportation in Saskatchewan

References 

683